Sheikh Harith Sulayman al-Dhari (al-Dari) or Harith ibn Sulayman ibn Dhari al-Zoba'i al-shamri (b. 1941 – 12 March 2015) was an Iraqi Sunni Arab cleric, and chairman of the Association of Muslim Scholars. He is also leader of the Zoba' tribe. An outspoken critic of the American invasion of Iraq, he is known as "the Spiritual Leader of the Iraqi Resistance" (Insurgency). His father and grandfather killed British Colonel Gerard Leachman and played a part in the 1920 revolt against British imperial rule, which was the fiercest in the Shi'ite south, and was a seminal moment of unity between Iraq's Sunnis, Shi'ites, and Kurds that forced the British to allow a form of self-rule.

Education

Harith al-Dhari was educated at Al-Azhar University in Cairo. He later worked in the Islamic Law department of Baghdad University.

Iraqi politics
Al-Dhari has been an outspoken critic of the foreign military presence in Iraq and has said that he approves of the Sunni armed resistance in the absence of a timetable for the withdrawal of Coalition troops. This stance has won him support among Sunni Arabs and respect among the rebels.

In May 2007 Al-Dhari did an interview with Time, taking a stand in opposition to Al-Qaeda in Iraq, but also in opposition to the American occupation and the Maliki government. In July 2007 Al-Dhari did an interview with Al Jazeera Live channel, which stated that Al-Qaeda in Iraq killed 50 members of his family.

His nephew Jamal al-Dhari currently leads the Iraqi National Project, a nationalist party that won a deputy in the 2021 parliamentary elections.

Arrest warrant
On November 16, 2006 Iraq's interior minister Jawad al-Bolani announced that an arrest warrant had been issued from the state's judicial system for Al-Dhari, who then lived between Cairo and Amman, on charges of inciting sectarian violence. "The government's policy is that anyone who tries to spread division and strife among the Iraq people will be chased by our security agencies."

In his speech on July 2, 2006, Osama Bin Laden praised Al-Dhari.

References

1941 births
2015 deaths
Academics from Baghdad
Iraqi activists
Iraqi Sunni Muslims
Al-Azhar University alumni
Academic staff of the University of Baghdad
International Union of Muslim Scholars members
Burials at Sahab Cemetery
Iraqi expatriates in Egypt